

List of Ambassadors

Nadav Eshcar 2017 - 
Meirav Eilon Shahar 2012 - 2017
Amnon Efrat 2009 - 2012
Ephraim Ben-Matityahu 2005 - 2009
Avraham Nir 2003 - 2005
Amikam Levy 2001 - 2003
Walid Mansour 1999 - 2001
Uri Halfon 1995 - 1998
David Matnai 1993 - 1995

References

Vietnam
Israel